Dreams & Chaos may refer to

Arts and entertainment

Literature
 [[Dreams & Chaos (book)|Dreams & Chaos]], a 2020 book by Sentilong Ozüküm, later turned into a web series mentioned below

Television
 Dreams & Chaos'', a 2020 web series based on the Sentilong Ozüküm's book